Mount Saint Michael Academy is an all-boys' Roman Catholic high school in the Wakefield neighborhood of the New York City borough of the Bronx. The school's campus also borders the city of Mount Vernon in neighboring Westchester County and is administered by the Roman Catholic Archdiocese of New York. 

The school opened on September 13, 1926, originally staffed by fourteen Marist Brothers, and dedicated to Saint Michael the Archangel. 

The U.S. Department of Education named it a National Blue Ribbon School in 1992.

Notable alumni 

Commerce and economics
 Rocco B. Commisso – founder, chairman and CEO of Mediacom
 George Ranalli – architect
 Donald T. Valentine (1950) – venture capitalist, Sequoia Capital; "Grandfather of Silicon Valley venture capital"

Fine arts and entertainment
 Lillo Brancato – actor, known for A Bronx Tale, Renaissance Man
 Sean Combs – rapper; music producer
 Paul Grassi – reality television personality
 Walter Murphy – pianist;  composer
 Ronnie Ortiz-Magro – reality television star, Jersey Shore
 Leon Robinson – actor; singer, known for Waiting to Exhale, Cool Runnings, Above the Rim
 Andre Royo – actor, known for the television series The Wire

Professional athletics
 Art Donovan – professional football player
 Richie Guerin (1950) – Naismith Hall of Famer; NBA basketball player; coach
 Bill O'Connor – professional football player
 Bill Polian – ESPN analyst; former Indianapolis Colts general manager and president
 Vince Promuto – professional football player
 Caraun Reid (2009) – defensive tackle for the Washington Redskins

Public service
 Philip Foglia – prosecutor;  Italian American civic rights activist
 Joaquín "Jack" García – federal criminal investigator
 Anthony Principi – former U.S. Secretary of Veterans Affairs

References 
Notes

Citations

External links 
 

Educational institutions established in 1926
Marist Brothers schools
Boys' schools in New York City
Roman Catholic high schools in the Bronx
Private middle schools in the Bronx
1926 establishments in New York City
Wakefield, Bronx